CD Shoot is a video game developed and published by Eaglevision Interactive Productions for the Philips CD-i in 1992. The aim of the game is clay pigeon shooting. The game has four modes: sporting, olympic trap, balltrap and English skeet.

Reception

References

1992 video games
Action video games
Sports video games
CD-i games
Video games developed in the Netherlands